Odds Ballklubb, commonly known as Odd, is a Norwegian football club from Skien. Originally the football section of a multi-sports club, founded in 1894 nine years after the club's founding. All other sports than football were discontinued and the club became dedicated to football only. Odd plays in the Norwegian top division, Tippeligaen, and holds the record winning the Norwegian Football Cup the most times, the last coming in 2000. The club was known as Odd Grenland between 1994 and 2012. During the 2018 season the club will be participating in the Eliteserien and NM Cupen.

Squad

Transfers

Winter

In:

 

 
 

Out:

}

Summer

In:

Out:

Competitions

Eliteserien

Results summary

Results by round

Results

Table

Norwegian Cup

Squad statistics

Appearances and goals

|-
|colspan="14"|Players away from Odd on loan:
|-
|colspan="14"|Players who left Odd during the season:

|}

Goal scorers

Disciplinary record

References

External links 
 Official website
 oddrane supporter club website

Odds BK seasons
Odds BK